Juan Antonio Barranco Gallardo (born 13 August 1947 in  Santiago de Calatrava, Jaén Province) is a retired Spanish politician in the Spanish Socialist Workers' Party. He was Mayor of Madrid following the 1986 death of Enrique Tierno Galván, who had been Mayor since 1979.

Barranco won the following municipal elections in 1987, but lost the mayoral race in June 1989. Juan Barranco was a municipal councillor for Madrid from 1983 to 1999. He was also a Senator for Madrid from 1989 until 2008 when he returned to the congress of deputies, again representing Madrid.

References

External links
Biography at Spanish Congress site

1947 births
Living people
People from the Province of Jaén (Spain)
Mayors of Madrid
Spanish Socialist Workers' Party politicians
Members of the Senate of Spain
Members of the constituent Congress of Deputies (Spain)
Members of the 1st Congress of Deputies (Spain)
Members of the 2nd Congress of Deputies (Spain)
Members of the 9th Congress of Deputies (Spain)
Members of the 9th Assembly of Madrid
Madrid city councillors (1987–1991)
Madrid city councillors (1983–1987)
Madrid city councillors (1991–1995)
Members of the Socialist Parliamentary Group (Assembly of Madrid)
First deputy mayors of Madrid